Aisha Nilaja Tyler (born September 18, 1970) is an American actress, comedian, director, and talk show host. She is known for playing Andrea Marino in the first season of Ghost Whisperer, Dr. Tara Lewis in Criminal Minds, Mother Nature in The Santa Clause films, and voicing Lana Kane in Archer, as well as recurring roles on CSI: Crime Scene Investigation, Talk Soup, and Friends.

She co-hosted seasons two through seven of CBS's The Talk, for which she won a Daytime Emmy Award for Outstanding Entertainment Talk Show Host. Since 2013, she has hosted Whose Line Is It Anyway?. She also hosted Ubisoft's E3 press conferences and has lent her voice to the video games Halo: Reach, Gears of War 3, and Watch Dogs.

Early life
Tyler was born on September 18, 1970, in San Francisco, California, the daughter of Robin Gregory, a teacher, and James Tyler, a photographer. The family spent one year in Ethiopia and later spent time living in an ashram in Oakland, California. Her parents separated when she was ten years old, after which her father raised her. Her maternal great-grandfather was Thomas Montgomery Gregory, a dramatist and educator, and her great-great-grandfather was Howard University professor James Monroe Gregory.

She pursued an early interest in comedy at McAteer High School in San Francisco, which had a special program called School of the Arts, now named Ruth Asawa San Francisco School of the Arts. Tyler attended high school with Sam Rockwell and Margaret Cho. She had a crush on Rockwell and followed him into acting class one day, leading to her interest in improv and sketch.

Tyler graduated from Dartmouth College in 1992. She was a member of The Tabard, a co-ed fraternity. At Dartmouth, she co-founded and sang in the Dartmouth Rockapellas, an all-female a cappella group devoted to spreading social awareness through song.

After briefly working for a San Francisco advertising firm, she toured the country pursuing a comedy career then moved to Los Angeles in 1996.

Career

Tyler's career in television took off in 2001 with jobs as the host of Talk Soup and the reality-dating series The Fifth Wheel, although Talk Soup was canceled the following year and Tyler left The Fifth Wheel in 2002 to pursue other interests. Tyler has devoted a significant amount of her time to independent projects, including a role in the play Moose Mating, for which she received an NAACP Image Award. She also wrote, directed, and starred in the independent short film The Whipper. Moving into acting, Tyler featured in Friends as Dr. Charlie Wheeler, Joey's and then Ross's girlfriend, in the ninth and tenth seasons. She followed this up with guest spots on CSI: Miami and Nip/Tuck, as well as balancing season-long recurring roles on both CSI: Crime Scene Investigation and 24 during the 2004–2005 television season. She also filmed her own talk show pilot for ABC and a sitcom pilot for CBS, neither of which was picked up. She has guest-starred on MADtv.

Following her regular role on the CBS series Ghost Whisperer during its first season, Tyler appeared in several films, including The Santa Clause 2, The Santa Clause 3: The Escape Clause, .45, and the comedy Balls of Fury. In 2007, she filmed the thriller Death Sentence and the crime drama Black Water Transit. She also continues to appear on television, with appearances on Boston Legal, Reno 911!, The Boondocks, and as a guest film critic on several episodes of At the Movies with Ebert & Roeper, filling in for the absent Roger Ebert while he recuperated from surgery.

Tyler has moved into print media as a regular contributor to Glamour, Jane, and Entertainment Weekly magazines. Her first book, Swerve: A Guide to the Sweet Life for Postmodern Girls, was released in January 2004. Tyler plays on the World Poker Tour in the Hollywood Home games for the Futures Without Violence charity. She also made a guest appearance on Kanye West's single "Slow Jamz", which featured Twista and Jamie Foxx. Philanthropy and charity work are very important to Tyler, and she regularly does volunteer work for the American Red Cross, The Trust for Public Land, Planned Parenthood Federation of America, and the International Rescue Committee.

Tyler appeared in a nude pictorial, along with other celebrities, in the May 2006 issue of Allure. The annual Nude Issue raises money to combat skin cancer.

In May 2009, it was announced that ABC had given Tyler her own talk show pilot, The Aisha Tyler Show. In early May 2010, she presented the "Welcome to the Beta" video for Halo: Reach. She also voiced a minor character in the game.

In 2009, she began her starring role voicing Lana Kane in the FX series Archer, which premiered on January 14, 2010 and has run for a total of 13 seasons as of 2022. In August 2010, Tyler began appearing in a recurring guest spot on The Stephanie Miller Show. The segment is named "Tuesdays With Tyler". Tyler appears either in-studio or via phone when she is not otherwise committed to one of her acting roles. While Hal Sparks was out of the country, Tyler filled in as the third member of the Stephanie Miller Sexy Liberal Comedy Tour on three shows in August 2011.

Also in 2009, Tyler performed her stand-up comedy routine live at the Fillmore Theatre.

Starting on July 26, 2011, Tyler started her own weekly podcast, Girl on Guy, where she interviews her favorite celebrity friends and discusses topics guys love. Girl on Guy is available on her website for download using iTunes, mp3, and RSS. The show launched as the No. 4 comedy podcast on iTunes and currently is the No. 2 comedy podcast and the No. 7 overall podcast on iTunes. The first weekly installment of Girl on Guy featured guest H. Jon Benjamin, the second featured the host of Current TV's former show InfoMania Brett Erlich on August 1, 2011, and the third featured Archer creator Adam Reed on August 9, 2011.

In October 2011, it was announced that Tyler would join the cast of The Talk as a permanent co-host, replacing Holly Robinson Peete. Her first full week as a co-host was from October 24 through October 28, 2011. Tyler is known for being expressive and outspoken on The Talk, especially about African American culture and stereotypes, LGBT rights, and women's rights. Tyler presented Ubisoft's press conference at E3 2012 in June, which received some backlash from fans who didn't believe Tyler was a gamer. This caused Tyler to respond with a poem about how she has been playing video games "since you were a twinge in the left side of your daddy's underoos." She returned to host the publisher's press conference the following year. Tyler's second book, Self-Inflicted Wounds: Heartwarming Tales of Epic Humiliation, debuted in July 2013, later becoming a New York Times bestseller; it was inspired by questions asked of guests on Girl on Guy.

In March 2013, Tyler was confirmed to be the new host of the American version of Whose Line Is It Anyway?. She also appears briefly as herself in the video game Watch Dogs and is featured in the music video for the "Weird Al" Yankovic song "Tacky". Tyler was also the original voice for the character Daisy Fitzroy in the 2013 video game BioShock Infinite, but her recordings were not used and the role went to Kimberly Brooks. She was nominated for Personality of 2014 in Golden Joystick Award 2014.

In June 2015, it was announced that Tyler landed a recurring role on the eleventh season of Criminal Minds as Dr. Tara Lewis. Although she served as a temporary replacement for Jennifer Love Hewitt, who was on maternity leave, her status was elevated to a main cast member in season 12.

In 2016, Tyler started a Kickstarter campaign to fund her directorial feature film debut, Axis. The film was shot over seven days in May 2016. Axis was released via video-on-demand on April 10, 2018.

On the June 15, 2017, episode of The Talk, Tyler announced that she would be leaving the show at the end of the seventh season due to her busy schedule with three other television shows and directing films. She said she would return as a guest host and promote her various projects.

Personal life 
Tyler married attorney Jeff Tietjens in 1992 or 1994 (sources differ). The pair separated in January 2015 and Tietjens filed for divorce in April 2016. The divorce was finalized in May 2017.

Tyler is a descendant of white 19th-century Texas congressman John Hancock through his son, Hugh Hancock. Hugh, a graduate of Oberlin College, was a prominent activist in the African-American community of Austin, Texas and leader in the Republican Party.

Tyler is a vocal advocate for the rights of the LGBT community.

Filmography

Film

Television

Video games

Web

Music videos

Director

Awards and nominations

Published works

Notes

References

External links

 

 

1970 births
20th-century African-American women
20th-century American actresses
20th-century American comedians
21st-century African-American women
21st-century American actresses
21st-century American comedians
21st-century American screenwriters
21st-century American women writers
21st-century American memoirists
Activists from California
Actresses from San Francisco
African-American actresses
African-American female comedians
African-American film directors
African-American film producers
African-American screenwriters
African-American television talk show hosts
African-American women writers
American film actresses
American film editors
American film producers
American music video directors
American podcasters
American stand-up comedians
American television actresses
American television talk show hosts
American video game actresses
American voice actresses
American women comedians
American women film directors
American women film editors
American women film producers
American women podcasters
American women screenwriters
American women memoirists
Comedians from California
Dartmouth College alumni
Film directors from San Francisco
American LGBT rights activists
Living people
Screenwriters from California
Writers from San Francisco